Raydure is an unincorporated community located in Monroe County, Kentucky, United States. It was also known as Johnstonville.

References

Unincorporated communities in Monroe County, Kentucky
Unincorporated communities in Kentucky